Sergey Morgunov (born 9 February 1993) is a Russian track and field athlete, specializing in the long jump.  On 20 June 2012 he set the World Junior Record in the event, jumping 8.35m (with a +1.1 wind) in Cheboksary, Russia.  The jump surpassed the longest standing record on the books, set by Randy Williams  while winning the gold medal at the 1972 Olympics.  Morgunov's jump, set while winning the Russian Junior Championships also tied him for the best jump of the year, by any athlete, to that point in the 2012 Olympic year.  The mark also qualified as the European Junior Record, formerly held by Spain's Eusebio Caceres.

Previous to setting the record, Morgunov had won the 2011 European Junior Championships in come from behind fashion with a final jump of 8.18m at Tallinn, Estonia.  He had been in the lead of that event with a wind legal 8.10m (+0.2), only to see it surpassed in the final round by Poland's Tomasz Jaszczuk.

The year before, as a 17-year-old, he participated in the 2010 Summer Youth Olympics, placing 7th in the final with a jump of 7.08.

Earlier in 2012, Morgunov had run 60m indoors in 6.80 and had jumped a wind aided 8.20m in Krasnodar plus a 7.94m indoors in 	Volgograd.

Major competitive record

References

External links

1993 births
Living people
Russian male long jumpers
Olympic male long jumpers
Olympic athletes of Russia
Athletes (track and field) at the 2012 Summer Olympics
Athletes (track and field) at the 2010 Summer Youth Olympics
World Athletics U20 Championships winners
Russian Athletics Championships winners
20th-century Russian people
21st-century Russian people